Samuel Kelsall (born 14 March 1993) is an English cricketer. Kelsall is a right-handed batsman who bowls right-arm medium pace. He was born in Stoke-on-Trent, Staffordshire. He was educated at Trentham High School.

Kelsall made his first-class debut for Nottinghamshire against Durham in the 2011 County Championship. He played two further first-class matches for Nottinghamshire, the last of which was against Oxford MCC University in 2014. Kelsall also played four List A matches for the county between 2011 and 2014. At the end of 2014 session he was released by Nottinghamshire. In 2015, he joined Lincolnshire and played Minor counties cricket before joining Staffordshire in 2016. , Kelsall has played 22 Minor Counties Championship matches and 15 MCCA Knockout Trophy matches and 4 Minor Counties T20 matches.

References

External links
Sam Kelsall at ESPNcricinfo
Sam Kelsall at CricketArchive

1993 births
Living people
Cricketers from Stoke-on-Trent
English cricketers
Nottinghamshire cricketers
Lincolnshire cricketers
Staffordshire cricketers